The 2022 Keio Challenger was a professional tennis tournament played on hard courts. It was the 15th (men's) and 5th (women's) editions of the tournament and part of the 2022 ATP Challenger Tour and the 2022 ITF Women's World Tennis Tour. It took place in Yokohama, Japan between 31 October and 13 November 2022.

Men's singles main-draw entrants

Seeds

 1 Rankings are as of 24 October 2022.

Other entrants
The following players received wildcards into the singles main draw:
  Tomoya Fujiwara
  Shinji Hazawa
  Masamichi Imamura

The following players received entry into the singles main draw using protected rankings:
  Tatsuma Ito
  Yūichi Sugita

The following players received entry from the qualifying draw:
  Hong Seong-chan
  Taisei Ichikawa
  Yuki Mochizuki
  Jonathan Mridha
  Ryota Tanuma
  James Trotter

The following player received entry as a lucky loser:
  Rimpei Kawakami

Women's singles main-draw entrants

Seeds

 1 Rankings are as of 31 October 2022.

Other entrants
The following players received wildcards into the singles main draw:
  Anri Nagata
  Remika Ohashi
  Suzuho Oshino
  Karen Tsutsumi

The following player received entry into the singles main draw using a protected ranking:
  Ayano Shimizu

The following players received entry from the qualifying draw:
  Erina Hayashi
  Aoi Ito
  Miyu Kato
  Natsumi Kawaguchi
  Honoka Kobayashi
  Michika Ozeki
  Himari Sato
  Eri Shimizu

The following players received entry as a lucky loser:
  Yuka Hosoki

Champions

Men's singles

  Christopher O'Connell def.  Yosuke Watanuki 6–1, 6–7(5–7), 6–3.

Women's singles
  Han Na-lae def.  Miyu Kato, 7–5, 6–0

Men's doubles

  Victor Vlad Cornea /  Ruben Gonzales def.  Tomoya Fujiwara /  Masamichi Imamura 7–5, 6–3.

Women's doubles
 Saki Imamura /  Naho Sato def.  Han Na-lae /  Mai Hontama, 6–4, 4–6, [10–5]

References

2022 ATP Challenger Tour
2022 ITF Women's World Tennis Tour
2022 in Japanese tennis
2022
October 2022 sports events in Japan
November 2022 sports events in Japan